East Fork Little River is a  river in the U.S. states of Alabama and Georgia.  It originates near LaFayette, Georgia and discharges into the Little River near Fort Payne, Alabama.

References

Rivers of Alabama
Rivers of Georgia (U.S. state)
Rivers of Walker County, Georgia
Bodies of water of DeKalb County, Alabama
Lookout Mountain